Salvard is a village in the Sisian Municipality of the Syunik Province in Armenia.

Toponymy 
The village was previously known as Alilu.

Demographics

Population 
The Statistical Committee of Armenia reported its population was 396 in 2010, down from 418 at the 2001 census.

References 

Populated places in Syunik Province